Odil Irgashev (born 10 February 1977) is a Tajikistani footballer who is a defender for Ravshan Kulob.

Career
Irgashev has played as a winger for several Tajik clubs, winning the Tajik League three times with Varzob Dushanbe (1998, 1999 and 2000) and winning the Tajik League, Tajik Cup and Tajik Super Cup treble with Esteghlal Dushanbe in 2010.

Irgashev has made several appearances for the Tajikistan national football team, and scored a goal at the 2006 AFC Challenge Cup.

Career statistics

International

Statistics accurate as of 22 October 2015

International goals

Honours
Varzob Dushanbe
Tajik League (2): 1998, 1999, 2000,
Tajik Cup (1): 1998, 1999
Regar-TadAZ
Tajik League (1): 2004, 2006, 2007, 2008
Tajik Cup (2): 2005, 2006
AFC President's Cup (1): 2005
Tajikistan
AFC Challenge Cup (1): 2006

References

External links
 
 
 Player profile – doha-2006.com
 

1977 births
Living people
Tajikistani footballers
Tajikistan international footballers
Footballers at the 2006 Asian Games
Association football defenders
Asian Games competitors for Tajikistan
CSKA Pamir Dushanbe players
FC Spartak Semey players
Regar-TadAZ Tursunzoda players
FC Zhashtyk-Ak-Altyn Kara-Suu players
FC Istiklol players
Tajikistani expatriate footballers
Expatriate footballers in Kazakhstan
Tajikistani expatriate sportspeople in Kazakhstan
Expatriate footballers in Kyrgyzstan
Tajikistani expatriate sportspeople in Kyrgyzstan